This is a list of the rivers wholly or partly in Iran, arranged geographically by river basin from west to east.

Flowing into the Persian Gulf 

Arvand Rud
Haffar, originally an artificial channel now forming the estuary of the Karun
Karun River
Marun River
Dez River
Bakhtiari River
Koohrang
Tigris (Iraq)
Karkheh River
Seimareh River
Chankula River
Sirwan River (Diyala River)
Alwand River
Little Zab
Bahmanshir, the original mouth of the Karun
Jarahi
Zohreh River
Helleh River
Mond River
Shur River
Mehran River
Kul River
Gowdeh River
Rostam River

Flowing into the Gulf of Oman 
Dozdan River
Jagin River
Gabrik River
Bahu Kalat River (or Dashtiari River or Silup River)

Flowing into endorheic basins

Lake Urmia 
 Aji Chay
 Quri Chay
 Zarrineh River
 Gadar River
 Ghaie River
 Alamlou River
 Leylan River
 Simineh River
 Mahabad River
 Barandouz River
 Shahar River
 Nazlou River
 Rozeh River
 Zola River

Caspian Sea 
Kura River (Azerbaijan)
Aras River
Balha River
Tulun River
Zangmar River
Barun River
Sefīd-Rūd
Qizil Üzan
Shahrood
Alamut River
Cheshmeh Kileh River
Do Hezar River
Se Hazar River
Chaloos River
Sardab River
Kojoor River
Haraz River
Noor River
Lar River
Atrek River
Sumbar River
Gharasu River

Namak Lake 
Abhar River
Qom River
Jajrood River
Karaj River

Gavkhouni 
Zayande River

Hamun-e Jaz Murian 
Halil River
Bampur River

Sistan Basin 

Helmand River

Hamun-i-Mashkel 
Mashkid River (Mashkel River)

Karakum Desert 
Harirud
Kashaf River

Other 

 Shesh Taraz

External links 
 Inventory of Shared Water Resources in Western Asia - waterinventory.org
 Water Resources and Quality in Iran - fanack.com

 
Iran
Rivers